Bagh-e Sheykh (also Romanized as Bāgh-e Sheykh, Bāgh-i-Shaikh, and Bāgh Sheykh; also known as Bāgh-e Shekh) is a village in Taraznahid Rural District, in the Central District of Saveh County, Markazi Province, Iran. At the 2006 census, its population was 1,002, in 231 families.

References 

Populated places in Saveh County